The San Diego horned lizard or Blainville's horned lizard (Phrynosoma blainvillii) is a species of phrynosomatid lizard native to southern and central California in the United States and northern Baja California in Mexico.

Taxonomy 
Described as a distinct species by John Edward Gray in 1839 (being named after Henri Marie Ducrotay de Blainville), it was later reclassified as a subspecies of the coast horned lizard (P. coronatum) in 1933. However, studies by Adam Leaché in 2006 and 2009 found sufficient genetic evidence to again classify P. blainvillii as a distinct species. In 2021, Gunther Köhler again reclassified blainvillii as a subspecies of P. coronatum, although the Reptile Database has not followed this.

Appearance 
The San Diego Horned Lizard or the Blainville's Horned Lizard (Phrynosoma blainvillii) is a flat bodied lizard with long spiky horns located on the top and side of its head and has smaller spikes throughout its body and tail.

The length of an adult size lizard can range from 2.5 inches to 4.5 inches measure from the tip of its snout to its bottom just before where the tail starts.  They are either red, brown, yellow or gray in color and have several black spots on their back and neck.

Distribution 
This species ranges from the Central Valley of California south through southern California to northern Baja California.

Habitat and range 
They range from Baja California, Sierra Nevada, Bay Area, and Shasta Reservoir.

These lizards are usually found to habitat near mountains in areas that are sandy, with low vegetation and near ant hills.

Defense 
Their first defensive strategy to avoid predators is to use their body color to blend in with their surroundings and to remain still.

If they are seen they will try to run away and hide in bushes to cover themselves in sand.

If they can not hide from predators they will try other defensive tactics such as hissing, biting, or using the horns on their heads and body as weapons. 

If they are out of defensive options they can shoot blood out of their eyes to scare off predators.

Diet 
Their diet is mostly Harvester ants but they do eat spiders, beetles, termites, and other insects.

Reproduction 
In Southern California, the San Diego horned lizard's reproductive period ranges from early March to June.

Each year the female Blainville's horned lizard can lay about 6-21 eggs in a year. A few months after they are laid in August-September they begin to hatch.

The females will lay their eggs in the Santa Monica and Simi Hills area.

Gender 
The difference between males and females is that the female lizards are bigger than the males. The males also have bigger horns on the base of their tails and have noticeable pores on the interior of their hind legs.

Population 
The San Diego horned lizard is no longer present in many sections of Southern California due to urbanization, and other types of habitat loss.

The population of horned lizards are declining because of habitat loss or degradation, hunting or capturing by humans and an increase of invasive species of Argentine ants.  

The lizard’s population was also impacted by the curio trade from 1890-1910, where it was estimated that 115,000 horned lizards in California were killed stuffed and sold as souvenirs.

Predators 
These lizards are vulnerable to a wide range of predators such as Badgers, Foxes, Coyotes, house pets, Greater Roadrunner, Loggerhead Shrike, American Kestrel, Burrowing Owl, and the Northern Pacific Rattlesnake.

References 

Phrynosoma
Reptiles of Mexico
Reptiles of the United States
Fauna of the Southwestern United States
Fauna of the Baja California Peninsula
Fauna of the California chaparral and woodlands
Reptiles described in 1839
Taxa named by John Edward Gray